Bruno Alexandre Silva Carvalho (born 10 March 1986) is a Portuguese football player who plays for 11 Esperanças.

Club career
He made his professional debut in the Segunda Liga for Atlético CP on 20 August 2011 in a game against Belenenses.

References

1986 births
Living people
People from Vila Franca de Xira
Portuguese expatriate footballers
Portuguese footballers
CD Operário players
C.D. Olivais e Moscavide players
Sertanense F.C. players
S.C. Farense players
Atlético Clube de Portugal players
Liga Portugal 2 players
Royal Antwerp F.C. players
Challenger Pro League players
K.S.K. Heist players
K. Berchem Sport players
Académico de Viseu F.C. players
Louletano D.C. players
C.F. Os Armacenenses players
Association football forwards
Expatriate footballers in Belgium
Portuguese expatriate sportspeople in Belgium
Sportspeople from Lisbon District